Auria is early Queen consort of Pamplona.

Auria may also refer to:

 Auria (gens), the Roman gens
 Domenico Auria, an Italian architect and sculptor of the Renaissance period

See also 
 Aurea (disambiguation)
 D'Auria